All of You is a live album by American jazz pianist Ahmad Jamal featuring performances recorded at Jamal's own club in Chicago in 1961 and released on the Argo label. On the cover, photographed by Don Bronstein, one of the first staff photographers for Playboy magazine, Jamal sits in an MAA chair, designed by George Nelson.

Critical reception
AllMusic awarded the album 4 stars stating "Jamal's group had a personal sound of its own, often playing quietly and leaving space but never losing the passion".

Track listing
 "Time on My Hands" (Harold Adamson, Mack Gordon, Vincent Youmans) – 6:15 
 "Angel Eyes" (Earl Brent, Matt Dennis) – 4:12 
 "You Go to My Head" (J. Fred Coots, Haven Gillespie) – 7:50 
 "Star Eyes" (Gene de Paul, Don Raye) – 5:55 
 "All of You" (Cole Porter) – 4:58 
 "You're Blasé" (Ord Hamilton, Bruce Siever) – 3:26 
 "What Is This Thing Called Love?" (Porter) – 5:29

Personnel
Ahmad Jamal – piano
Israel Crosby – bass
Vernel Fournier – drums

References 

Ahmad Jamal live albums
1961 live albums
Albums produced by Leonard Chess
Argo Records live albums